Angella Franklin Keihongani Katatumba [born on 21 February 1989] is a Ugandan singer, songwriter, philanthropist, diplomat and businesswoman.

Early life, education and background 
Angella was in Nairobi, Kenya. She is the daughter of the Honorary Consul of Pakistan in Uganda, H.E Prof. Boney Mwebesa Katatumba and Gertrude Katatumba the proprietor AFK Beauty Clinic Kabalagala. Angella has a sister and seven brothers; Rosemary, Allan, Dennis, Rugiirwa (Angella's Twin brother), Colin (late), Ken, Ian and Jay.

She went to primary education in Uganda at the Katatumba Academy, then went to Belmont Senior Secondary School in Vancouver, B.C Canada, where she obtained a Public Relations Diploma. She then went to Oxford Brookes University, England where she got Bachelor of Arts degrees in Economics and Law. Also at Oxford Brookes University, England, she continued on to obtain a master's degree in International Management/Public Relations. She then moved to Chicago, Illinois, where she worked.

When Angella moved back home to Uganda, she started working as the managing director at her father's Hotel Diplomaté. When her father died in 2017, as his deputy, she became the Acting Honorary Consul of Pakistan in Uganda for two years, until the President of Pakistan H.E Mamnoon Hussain, appointed someone else.

In addition to music, Angella started an NGO called the Angella Katatumba Development Foundation (AKDF) which is the umbrella of Angella's music projects.

Key achievements 
• In 2010 The British Council appointed Angella as the Climate Change ICON in Uganda.

• On 23 May 2016, Angella was invited by the United Nations Secretary-General Ban-Ki Moon, to attend and perform at the first-ever UN World Humanitarian Summit in Istanbul, Turkey.

• On 28 November 2016 Angella was invited by the African Union to represent Uganda at the 4th Annual Humanitarian Symposium in Nairobi, Kenya.

• On 9 September 2017, Angella had her first European headline performance in Austria, dubbed ‘African Gala’ at Längenfeldgasse 13-15 Street 1120, Vienna.

Discography 
Angella started to professionally record her music in Uganda. So far, she has recorded four albums.

• Peace Album – 10 tracks; For You Gulu, Peace ft. Buchaman, Sikyetaga ft. Bebe Cool, I Live For You, Let Me, I Surrender, One Minute Man ft. Bebe Cool, Success and Standing in the Rain.

• Glad I'm Alive Album - 10 tracks; Feel Alright ft. Navio, Glad I'm Alive, Thank You, The Pledge, Without You, Wind Beneath Your Wings, A Better Place ft. First Love, Forgiveness, Ngenze Noono and Gwenjagala.

• Supernatural Girl Album - 15 tracks; Mulago Yaffe, Together Forever, Let's Go Green ft. Keko, In the Air ft. Keko, Only You, The Struggle ft. NTO, So Painful ft. NTO, Multiply By 2 ft. Radio and Weasel, Out of My Head ft. Kuzi Kz, They Don't Care About Us ft. Kuzi Kz, Supernatural Girl, So Close, Tonelabila ft. Daddy Andre, Darling ft. Mr. Green, Strange Feelings ft. Herbert Skillz.

• Wendi Album - 15 tracks;
Inside, All About You, Cool Down, Mukyikiri, Wendi ft. Daddy Andre, Goshodo ft. Mbuzi Gang, Only Jesus, Dance For You, Hey, Sample Dat, Jump In ft. Jegede, Love Me ft. Kent & Flosso, This Boy ft. Pastor Yiga, Emotional and Tubigezeeko.

References

External links 
"Katatumba's failed 8-year marriage to her first love"
"How I keep fit Angella Katatumba: Artiste, managing director, Hotel Diplomat"
"Angella Katatumba's Journey to Personal Progress"

21st-century Ugandan women singers
Living people
Kumusha
1989 births